Peter Jonas may refer to:

Peter Jonas (footballer) (born 1959), Australian rules footballer and coach
Sir Peter Jonas (director) (1946–2020), British opera director
Peter Jonas (figure skater) (born 1941), Austrian figure skater
Peter Jonas (physiologist), German neurophysiologist